Kern River Slough was the distributary of the Kern River running south from the vicinity of Bakersfield to Kern Lake near Arvin, in Kern County, California.

This former body of water of the Tulare Lake Basin in the San Joaquin Valley, is now dry from agricultural diversion of its waters.

See also

References

Kern River
Rivers of Kern County, California
Tulare Basin watershed
Geography of the San Joaquin Valley
History of the San Joaquin Valley
Natural history of the Central Valley (California)
Rivers of Southern California
Rivers of Northern California